The Taranto–Bridisi railway is an Italian 70-kilometre long railway line, connecting Taranto with Brindisi.

The line was opened in three stages in 1886. On 6 January 1886 the section from Taranto to Latiano opened, then with effect from 25 August 1886 the line was further extended from Latiano to Mesagne, and finally on 30 December 1886 the final length from Mesagne to Brindisi came into use.

Usage
The line is used by the following service(s):

Night train (Intercity Notte) Milan - Ancona - Pescara - Foggia - Bari - Taranto - Brindisi - Lecce
Local services (Treno regionale) Taranto - Francavilla Fontana - Brindisi

Gallery

References

Footnotes

Sources
 
 
 

Railway lines opened in 1886
Railway lines in Apulia
1886 establishments in Italy